Slauson Avenue is a major east–west thoroughfare traversing the central part of  Los Angeles County, California. It was named for the land developer and Los Angeles Board of Education member J. S. Slauson. It passes through Culver City, Ladera Heights, View Park-Windsor Hills, South Los Angeles, Huntington Park, Maywood, Commerce, Montebello, Pico Rivera, Whittier, and Santa Fe Springs. The street runs  from  McDonald Street in Culver City and to Santa Fe Springs Road, where it becomes Mulberry Drive in Whittier. Mulberry Drive ends at Scott Avenue in South Whittier.

Transit

Metro Rail
There are three major transit stations (two light rail) on Slauson Avenue. They include the Slauson Station of the Metro A Line and the Hyde Park Station on the Metro K Line.

Metro Bus and Freeways
Slauson/I-110 Station of the Metro J Line is elevated in the median of Interstate 110 freeway.

Metro Local line 108 operates on Slauson Avenue. 

The eastern terminus of the State Route 90, the Marina Freeway, is at Slauson Avenue.
In Los Angeles, the street is south of Washington Boulevard and Vernon Avenue, but north of Gage Avenue and Florence Avenue.

Landmarks
Slauson Avenue was noted for a former Bethlehem Steel mill on the 3300 block. At one time Slauson Avenue was a center for urban heavy industry in Los Angeles; the ATSF Harbor Subdivision once ran along Slauson Avenue. It is also known for the  Simply Wholesome Vegetarian restaurant and Health food store, as well as the historic Jet Inn motor hotel.

Revitalization Project
Portions of Slauson Avenue have been revitalized with a new tree-lined barrier, new LED street and traffic lights and metro local bus benches. The project was officially completed in May 2017.

In popular culture

Nipsey Hussle 
Rapper Ermias Asghedom (1985–2019), professionally known as Nipsey Hussle, was from Los Angeles. He frequently referred to Crenshaw and Slauson Avenue in his music, and was nicknamed Neighborhood Nip for that reason. He owned the Marathon Clothing Store on the intersection. The intersection was named Ermias “Nipsey Hussle” Asghedom Square in April 2019 to honor him.

The Tonight Show
The avenue became well known to non-Angelenos around the U.S.  because of Johnny Carson's running joke about the "Slauson Cutoff" during his "Tea-Time Movie" sketches on The Tonight Show.

See also
 Baldwin Hills Mountains
 Lester R. Rice-Wray—Los Angeles City Council member recalled from office because of his stand on a mid-20th century Slauson storm-drain proposal

References

Baldwin Hills (mountain range)
Culver City, California
Huntington Park, California
Inglewood, California
Maywood, California
Montebello, California
Pico Rivera, California
Whittier, California
Streets in Los Angeles County, California
South Los Angeles